Women's Viewpoint is a British discussion television programme which aired on BBC during 1951. The programme focused on the discussion of issues by women. It is unlikely any of the episodes still exist, given that the BBC rarely telerecorded shows prior to 1953.

Episodes
"Is There a Women's Viewpoint?" (3 April 1951)
"Women in Politics" (17 April 1951)
"The Education of Girls (1 May 1951)
"Women's Magazines" (29 May 1951)
"The Home and the State" (11 June 1951)

References

External links
 

1950s British television series
1951 British television series debuts
1951 British television series endings
BBC Television shows
Black-and-white British television shows
British non-fiction television series
Lost BBC episodes